The United States Treasury Police was the federal security police of the United States Department of the Treasury responsible for providing police and security to the Treasury Building and the Treasury Annex.

History 
In 1879, guards were appointed to safeguard the coins, currency and documents of the US Treasury and fell under the office of the Chief Clerk of the Treasury department. They were later renamed as the Treasury Guard Force. On 1 July 1937, the Secretary of the Treasury placed the TGF along with the Guard Force of the Bureau of Engraving and Printing, under the authority of the United States Secret Service where they became the Uniformed Force of the Secret Service. 

On 1 July 1953, the Uniformed Force was again split in half and one half again became the Guard Force of the Bureau of Engraving and Printing. 

After 1960, when the USSS moved out of the main treasury building the TGF became responsible for arresting and interviewing check and bond forgers and performing on-site investigations into thefts, threats, violence, and deal with mentally ill persons on Treasury property.

In 1970, the TGF became the Treasury Security Force and in 1976 the Guards became Police officers after a ruling by the United States Civil Service Commission. In 1983 the TPF became the Treasury Police Force and in 1986 merged with the Uniformed Division of the Secret Service.

In 1991, a decision was made to create a second currency manufacturing facility and the site was donated by Ross Perot to the city of Fort Worth who signed it over to the Federal Govt. The Bureau of Engraving and Printing Western Currency Facility was born. So that it needed to be protected, the BEP Police were assembled from US Air Force and US Navy security personnel who worked at nearby JRB/NAS Fort Worth and would be separating from service in time to start the police force.

Organization

Headed by a Chief of Police, the TPF was a relatively small force which operated in three shifts each headed by a lieutenant. The Nightwatch administrator, the Pass and Reception Sergeant, and the training lieutenant reported directly to the Chief.

See also
 Bureau of Engraving and Printing Police
 United States Mint Police
 Federal Police

References

Bibliography
 Donald A. Torres (1985). Handbook of Federal Police and Investigative Agencies. Greenwood Press.  and 

 
1879 establishments in the United States
Protective security units
Defunct federal law enforcement agencies of the United States